Bernhard Mair (born 20 June 1971) is an Italian bobsledder. He competed in the four man event at the 1994 Winter Olympics.

References

1971 births
Living people
Italian male bobsledders
Olympic bobsledders of Italy
Bobsledders at the 1994 Winter Olympics
Sportspeople from Bruneck